Peter Pindar may refer to:

Sir Peter Pindar, paid Charles I of England for the right to work the royal Alum mines in Yorkshire
Sir Peter Pindar, 1st Baronet (died c. 1693) the first of the Pindar baronets of Idinshaw (1662)
Peter Pindar, a pen name of John Wolcot (1738–1819), satirist, born in Dodbrooke in Devon